Agenda is a think tank focused on both politics in Norway and international affairs, located in Oslo, Norway. Agenda started activities in August 2014. The think tank is headed by Marte Gerhardsen, a former diplomat and director of DNB ASA and secretary general of Care Norway. Chairman of the Board is the lawyer Geir Lippestad.

Agenda's research focuses particularly on five topics: Labour economics, welfare, integration, climate change and energy, as well as foreign policy. Occasionally, it has also commented on party tactics aiming to establish a broader alliance at the left spectrum of Norwegian politics. The think tank has a stated ideological orientation towards the center-left. It partly seeks a position in opposition to the liberal think tank Civita, which is funded by the Confederation of Norwegian Enterprise. Agenda is a non-partisan and non-profit entity funded jointly by the Norwegian Confederation of Trade Unions (LO), and by the Norwegian CEO and philanthropist Trond Mohn.

In public discourse, the think tank has argued in favor of shifting towards taxing property objects with higher rates, in conjunction with reforming the Norwegian "Wealth Tax", as well as lowering income tax rates and the corporate tax. Agenda has also published reports on economic inequality, agriculture reform, test standards in the school system, labor productivity, green technology, social mobility, international development aid, and gender inequality in the work place.

References

External links
 Tankesmien Agenda - official website.

Think tanks based in Norway